White Queen, in comics, may refer to:

Marvel Comics characters, members of Hellfire Club:
Paris Seville, member of the Council of the Chosen
Emma Frost, member of The Lords Cardinal
Storm (Marvel Comics), after the Dark Phoenix Saga
Adrienne Frost, Emma's sister
Sat-Yr-9 (pretending to be Courtney Ross)
DC Comics characters who are members of Checkmate:
Oksana Verchenko, during the events around The OMAC Project
Amanda Waller, as part of the post-Infinite Crisis line-up, who had earlier been Black King
Valentina Vostok, a former member of Doom Patrol, who replaced Waller when her plans were revealed

See also
White Queen (disambiguation)
Black Queen (comics)
White King (comics)
Red Queen (comics), the White Queen equivalent in the London branch of the Hellfire Club